Mountain View High School is a public high school in the northwest United States, located in Bend, Oregon.

History
Mountain View High School opened  in 1979 as the second high school in the greater Bend area. It was the first new high school in the area since Bend High School had opened in 1904, and the two schools remained the only traditional high schools in Bend until Summit High School opened in 2001 (Marshall High School is a magnet high school also located in Bend). The school's first principal was Jack Harris; after his retirement in 1987, the school named the football stadium after him. 

The school's mascot is a Cougar; MVHS originally adopted University of Notre Dame's fight song, but it is now based on that of Washington State University, whose mascot is also the cougar.

Academics
In 2008, 80% of the school's seniors received a high school diploma. Of 346 students, 278 graduated, 58 dropped out, four received a modified diploma, and six were still in high school in 2009.

Athletics

State titles
 Cross country: 1995 (boys), 2000 (girls)
 Football: 2011
 Nordic skiing: 2008, 2009, 2010 
 Alpine skiing: 1983, 1985, 1986, 1989, 1990, 1992, 1998
 Soccer: 1999 (boys)
 Swimming: 1992 (girls), 1995 (girls), 2001 (girls), 2001 (boys)
 Water polo: 2013, 2015, 2016

Notable alumni
 Linsey Corbin – professional triathlete
 Ashton Eaton – University of Oregon decathlete, 2016 Olympic Champion, 2012 Olympic champion
 Cody Hollister – NFL wide receiver for the Tennessee Titans
 Jacob Hollister – NFL tight end for the Buffalo Bills
 Ethan Blair Miller – perpetrator of the 2022 Bend, Oregon shooting
 Jourdan Miller – 20th winner of America's Next Top Model
 Ben Ferguson – professional snowboarder

References

External links
 Mountain View High School website

High schools in Deschutes County, Oregon
Educational institutions established in 1979
Education in Bend, Oregon
Public high schools in Oregon
1979 establishments in Oregon